Peter Capano is a State Representative who represents the 11th Essex District in the Massachusetts House of Representatives. He represents the towns of Lynn,  and Nahant. Capano serves on the Joint Committee on Cannabis Policy, Joint Committee on Housing, Joint Committee on Public Service,  and the Joint Committee on Transportation.

Early life and education
Capano served in the United States army 1976–79. He received a bachelor's degree in labor studies from the University of Massachusetts Boston.

See also
 2019–2020 Massachusetts legislature
 2021–2022 Massachusetts legislature

References

Living people
Year of birth missing (living people)
21st-century American politicians
Democratic Party members of the Massachusetts House of Representatives
University of Massachusetts Boston alumni
United States Army soldiers